Most Lithuanian immigrants arrived in Ireland in the 2000s, when the Irish economy started booming. According to Census 2011, there are 36,683 people of Lithuanian birth resident in the Republic of Ireland. Approximately one third of these Lithuanians live in County Dublin.

History
In the beginning of the 20th century there was some immigration of  Lithuanian Jews. Robert Briscoe, who served as lord mayor of Dublin in 1956-57 and 1961–62, was son of Lithuanian a Jewish immigrants to Ireland. In contrast, the current immigration is of majority Catholic Lithuanians, as Lithuania contained few Jews in 2000.

In 1935, Feliksas Vaitkus, the sixth person who had a successful flight over Atlantic Ocean with a single engine single seat fixed-wing aircraft, landed in Ireland. Vaitkus flew his transatlantic flight with Lituanica II. Vaitkus had to fight the worst possible weather conditions and was helped considerably by hourly broadcasts from an Irish radio station. He learned that Dublin was fogged in, as well as all areas heading east as far as the Baltic Sea. He knew that he could not make it to Kaunas due to his low fuel supply, and being exhausted after a 23-hour struggle fighting the elements, he felt it was best to come down somewhere in Ireland. He spotted an open field in Cloongowla at Ballinrobe, County Mayo and came down, with the aircraft suffering extensive damage. He was lucky to survive and not sustain any significant injuries. Lituanica II was crated for shipment to Lithuania, where it was restored. Vaitkus made his way to Kaunas, by ship and train, where he was given a hero's welcome.

Organisations

The Lithuanian Association in Ireland Limited, officially registered in January 2005, has been active since 1999. The association organises Lithuanian concerts and other events in Dublin, Cork, Monaghan and Portlaoise, runs eight Lithuanian weekend schools in Dublin, Cork, Dundalk, Galway etc. for Lithuanian children, runs a mailing list lithuaniansinireland with over 700 members, publishes information for Lithuanians in Ireland on a web site  and organises monthly Lithuanian gatherings around Ireland.
Saloje (On the Island)  published twice a month, which has around 5000 readers, and the weekly Lietuvis (Lithuanian) (5000 copies) are the most popular local papers among the Lithuanian community.

See also
 Lituanica

References

External links 
 Newspaper "Saloje" (On The Island) for Lithuanians in Ireland

Ireland
Ethnic groups in Ireland
Irish people of Lithuanian descent